is a Japanese anime director and producer currently residing in Karatsu, Saga. After graduating from Meiji Gakuin University in 1980, Nishimura entered into the anime studio Nishiko Production. Nishimura had his first job as a producer for Baldios in 1980, and went on to be in charge of production in other series such as Six God Combination Godmars, and Magical Princess Minky Momo in 1982. An episode of Urusei Yatsura he directed in 1982, "After You've Gone" (episode #44), was voted the favorite episode of the TV series by Japanese fans. In 1984, Nishimura resigned from Nishiko and in 1985 had his director debut with Pro Golfer Saru. Since then, he has worked as the director on many anime produced by Studio Deen, notably Ranma ½ (serving as series director on later television seasons and for the OVA series as well) and Kyo Kara Maoh!. In 2019, he was named as director of a new anime series, Vladlove, about a girl vampire that was written by Mamoru Oshii and financed by Ichigo Inc.

Anime involved in
Billy Inu Nandemo Shokai: Director
Bakuon!!: Director
Basilisk: The Ōka Ninja Scrolls: Director
Bermuda Triangle: Colorful Pastrale: Director
Chained Soldier: Chief director
Code-E: Screenplay
D-1 Devastator: Director
Dog Days: Director
Extreme Hearts: Director
Ghost in the Shell: Stand Alone Complex 2nd GIG: Storyboard (ep 29, 33)
Glasslip: Director
Kishin Dōji Zenki Gaiden: Anki Kitan: Director
 Koitabi ~True Tours Nanto: Director
Kyo Kara Maoh!: Director
Kyo Kara Maoh! R: Director
Lupin the Third: The Woman Called Fujiko Mine: Script (ep 8)
Mars: Director
Minami no Shima no Chiisana Hikouki Birdy: Series Composition
Neo Yokio: Director
OL Kaizo Koza: Storyboard
Otaku no Seiza: Storyboard
Pro Golfer Saru: Director
Ranma ½: Director
Ranma ½: One Flew Over the Kuno's Nest: Director
Samurai Deeper Kyo Series director, Storyboard (ep 1–3, 5–6, 11, 14)
Sengoku Majin GoShogun: Animation director
Shutendoji: Director (ep 1, 2)
Simoun: Director, Script (ep 3, 9, 10, 14, 16, 17, 19, 22, 25), Storyboard (ep 1, 2, 8, 12, 14, 16, 19, 22, 24, 25)
Soul Hunter: Director
The Fire Hunter: Director
True Tears: Director, Script (ep 2, 5), Storyboard (ep 1, 2, 3, 5), Episode Director (ep 1)
Urusei Yatsura: Assistant director
Urusei Yatsura: Beautiful Dreamer: Associate Director
Violinist of Hameln: Series director
ViVid Strike!: Director
Vlad Love: Director
Windy Tales: Director
You're Under Arrest: The Movie: Director
Zenki: Director

See also
 Mamoru Oshii
 Ichigo Inc.

References

External links

1955 births
Anime directors
Living people
People from Saga Prefecture
Meiji Gakuin University alumni